Local Heroes is a British online on-demand end-to-end service that connects people with local plumbers, electricians, and other tradespeople. It was launched in early 2016 by a multinational utility company, Centrica, as an innovation of its subsidiary, British Gas.

It operates across Great Britain and Ireland and works with a network of independent tradespeople to fulfil customer jobs. All tradespeople are vetted by British Gas and must have required qualifications relevant to their trade.

History

Launched in February 2016, Local Heroes limited availability to the Croydon area, before expanding to the West Midlands in October, Glasgow in April 2017. UK wide coverage was completed in June 2017.

Local Heroes was nominated for the Best New Proposition Award at the CEA 2017 and won the Customer Engagement Award at the Peer Awards 2018.

Local Heroes launched its app for traders, Toolbox, in August 2018.

Operations

The Local Heroes website requires registered tradespeople to accept jobs on their site via email, smartphone or desktop computer.

Pricing and payments

When a user completes the form requesting a tradesperson, Local Heroes uses market research and historical data to provide an estimated price range for the requested job. If accepted, the Local Hero will then provide a final quote directly to the user which they can choose whether to accept or not.

As all jobs are guaranteed by British Gas, the user must pay directly to Local Heroes and will void the guarantee if cash is paid. Once a job is complete, the tradesperson creates a bill for the customer who then pay via PayPal or credit card.

Requirements for Heroes

In order for a tradesperson to become a Local Hero they must have £2 million Public Liability Insurance and provide banking details and a company logo or profile picture.

In addition, certain trades require specific qualifications such as registration with a government approved Competent Persons scheme e.g. NICEIC.

Trades

Local Heroes operate in a range of trades and are still expanding. Their current offering includes the following trades:

 Plumbers
 Heating Engineers 
 Drainage Engineers
 Electricians 
 Handypeople 
 Painters and Decorators 
 Plasterers 
 Tilers 
 Locksmiths 
 Appliance Engineers

References

External links
 Official website

British companies established in 2016
Centrica
Companies based in Berkshire
2016 establishments in England
Electrical trades organizations
Online companies of the United Kingdom
Plumbing organizations